Gastón Fernando de los Santos (born April 19, 1982 in Montevideo) is a Uruguayan football defender who last played for Club Atlético Progreso in the Uruguayan Segunda División.

In 2001, he began his career playing for modest club Rampla Juniors. After six years with the rojiverdes, he transferred to C.A. Bella Vista, where he played for one season. In 2009 manager Pablo Repetto brought him to join Bolivian team Blooming, Later in the year, he signed for Uruguayan club Juventud de Las Piedras. In 2010, he returned to Rampla Juniors that is the first club in his career after three years since he left the club.

References

External links
 
 

1982 births
Living people
Uruguayan footballers
Association football defenders
Rampla Juniors players
C.A. Bella Vista players
Club Blooming players
Sportivo Cerrito players
Estudiantes de Mérida players
Expatriate footballers in Bolivia
Expatriate footballers in Venezuela
Uruguayan expatriates in Bolivia
Uruguayan expatriate sportspeople in Venezuela
Rampla Juniors managers